Byer is an unincorporated community in northwestern Washington Township, Jackson County, Ohio, United States.

History
Prior to the Civil War, Byer was known as Ellsworth, but the name was changed to Byers Station in honor of the Byers family, local landowners.  The Byers Station Post Office was established on June 5, 1871.  The town name was shortened to Byer on November 29, 1882, and ultimately the post office was discontinued November 29, 1882.  Mail service is now handled by the Wellston branch.

The Byer Covered Bridge, is located here.  Built in 1870, it is listed on the National Register of Historic Places.

Pigeon Creek, a subsidiary of the Scioto River through Salt Creek, runs along the western edge of Byer.

References

Unincorporated communities in Jackson County, Ohio
Unincorporated communities in Ohio